The MTV Asia Awards 2008 returned on August 2, 2008 after a one-year hiatus. The event was held at the 6,000-seat Arena of Stars in Genting Highlands, Malaysia. This was the first time the award show was held in Malaysia. This was the sixth and final MTV Asia Awards.

Nominees were announced on June 14, 2008 via the channel. At the same day the MTV Asia Awards official website was also reopened. Voting commences from June 14 until July 25, 2008. Unlike previous award shows, international categories were not chosen by viewers (except for the Favorite International Artist in Asia award) and included for the first time Best Hook Up, Bring Da House Down, and the Innovation Award.

Viewers were able to vote from the official site or by text messaging service. The event was hosted by Jared Leto of Thirty Seconds to Mars and Karen Mok as co-host.

Performers
Jabbawockeez
The Pussycat Dolls
OneRepublic
Electrico & Stefanie Sun
The Script
Leona Lewis
Super Junior
The Click Five
Panic! at the Disco

Also a special performance from Project E.A.R., a rap group consisting of at least one personnel from Hip Hop group Ahli Fiqir (Singapore), Pop Shuvit (Malaysia), Saint Loco (Indonesia), Slapshock (Philippines), Silksounds and Thaitanium from Thailand.

Presenters
 Dave Farrell
 Jaclyn Victor
Joe Flizzow
Leo Ku
Miguel Chavez
Moots!
The Pussycat Dolls
Show Lo
Stefanie Sun
The Script

International awards

Favorite International Artist in Asia

Avril Lavigne
Fergie
Justin Timberlake
Linkin Park

Bring Da House Down

Black Eyed Peas
Christina Aguilera
Muse
Linkin Park

The Innovation Award

Goldfrapp
Gwen Stefani
Kanye West
Radiohead

Best Hook Up

OneRepublic feat. Timbaland – "Apologize"
Rihanna feat. Jay Z – "Umbrella"
Avril Lavigne feat. Lil Mama – "Girlfriend"
Beyoncé & Shakira – "Beautiful Liar"

Breakthrough Artist

OneRepublic
Leona Lewis
Daughtry
Mika

Video Star

Thirty Seconds to Mars – "A Beautiful Lie"
Justice – "D.A.N.C.E."
Fergie – "Clumsy"
Panic! at the Disco – "Nine in the Afternoon"

Regional awards

Favorite Artist Mainland China

The Flowers
Li Yuchun
Wang Feng
Yang Kun

Favorite Artist Hong Kong

Andy Lau
Eason Chan
Joey Yung
Leo Ku

Favorite Artist Indonesia

Andra and the BackBone
Yovie & Nuno
Mulan Jameela
Nidji

Favorite Artist Korea

Big Bang
TVXQ
Girls' Generation
Wonder Girls
Super Junior

Favorite Artist Malaysia

Faizal Tahir
Pop Shuvit
Nicholas Teo
Siti Nurhaliza

Favorite Artist Philippines

Urbandub
Sandwich
Sponge Cola
Chicosci

Favorite Artist Singapore

Electrico
JJ Lin
Tanya Chua
Stefanie Sun

Favorite Artist Taiwan

Mayday
Jolin Tsai
S.H.E
Show Lo

Favorite Artist Thailand

Bodyslam
K-Otic
Saksit Vejsupaporn
Groove Riders

Special awards

The Style Award

Panic! at the Disco

The Knockout Award

The Click Five

The Inspiration Award

Karen Mok

References

https://web.archive.org/web/20081204233542/http://www.mtvasia.com/News/200808/02016352.html

External links
MTV Asia Awards official website
MTV Asia

MTV Asia Awards
2008 music awards